Kateryna Burmistrova (sometimes written as Burmystrova, born 20 November 1979) is a Ukrainian wrestler.

Burmistrova was born on 20 November 1979 in Sumy, Ukraine. At the 2012 Summer Olympics held in London, United Kingdom, she competed in the women's freestyle 72 kg event where she lost her first bout, in the round of 16, against Russia's Natalia Vorobieva.

References

External links
 

1979 births
Living people
Wrestlers at the 2012 Summer Olympics
Ukrainian female sport wrestlers
Olympic wrestlers of Ukraine
Sportspeople from Sumy
World Wrestling Championships medalists
Universiade medalists in wrestling
Universiade silver medalists for Ukraine
Medalists at the 2005 Summer Universiade
20th-century Ukrainian women
21st-century Ukrainian women